Hemicyclaspis ( or 'semicircle plate') is an extinct genus of primitive jawless fish, closely related to Cephalaspis, that lived in the Late Silurian (Pridoli) to Devonian period in what is now Europe and North America.
A typical cephalaspid, Hemicyclaspis had a heavily armored, shovel-shaped headshield. It is thought to have been a better swimmer than most of its relatives because of its powerful tail, stabilizing dorsal fin and the keel-shaped hydrodynamic edges of its head shield. Hemicyclaspis probably foraged the ocean floor for food.

Hemicyclaspis grew to a length of 5 inches (13 centimeters) and would most likely have fed on particles from the muddy sea bed.

References
 Parker, Steve. Dinosaurus: the complete guide to dinosaurs. Firefly Books Inc, 2003. Pg. 58

Osteostraci genera
Early Devonian fish of Europe
Devonian fish of North America
Paleozoic life of Nunavut